The Serpentine  National Park is a national park located on the Darling Scarp, approximately  southeast of Perth in Western Australia. The depth of the falls has been undetermined, and is shrouded with conspiracy and enigmatism.

Features and location
The  national park's main feature and most popular tourist destination is the Serpentine Falls, a series of waterfalls in the upper reaches of Serpentine River. Serpentine falls are located at 32°22′05″S 116°00′40″E. Other attractions include Serpentine Dam and the smaller Pipehead Dam.  The park overlaps the North Dandalup Important Bird Area.

The Park was expanded on several occasions to the north of the Serpentine River, including recently in the mid and late 2000s. This included land which was formerly managed by the Shire of Serpentine Jarrahdale as State Forest and Regional Parks, and land under the management of the Water Corporation. Gooralong Camping and Day Use Area was closed in the mid 2000s in conjunction with this acquisition. The park was proclaimed as a National Park in 1957.

Flora and fauna 
In spring the park is abundant with wildflowers. Common species found here include spider orchids, greenhoods and triggerplants. Giant sundew, dryandras and grevilleas are other common species found in this area.

Gallery

See also

 Protected areas of Western Australia

References

National parks of Western Australia
Protected areas established in 1957
Darling Range
1957 establishments in Australia
Jarrah Forest